The Dream Catcher is a 1999 American independent drama film, directed by Edward Radtke. It is a road movie, telling the story of two boys on the road.

Reception
On the review aggregator website Metacritic, which uses a weighted average, assigned the film a score of 61 out of 100 based on 5 critics, indicating "generally favorable reviews". In his review for The New York Times, Stephen Holden said the film "sustains a mood of aimless adolescent angst, and its vision of the road is uncompromisingly bleak."

Film festivals
In 1999, Terry Stacey won special mention for cinematography and Paddy Connor won special mention for acting at the Thessaloniki Film Festival.

References

External links
 
 

1999 films
1999 drama films
American drama films
1990s English-language films
1990s American films